Eberlanzia may refer to:
 Eberlanzia (arachnid), a genus of arachnids in the family Daesiidae
 Eberlanzia (plant), a genus of plants in the family Aizoaceae